Justice Wynne may refer to:

Kenneth Wynne, associate justice of the Connecticut Supreme Court
Robin F. Wynne, associate justice of the Arkansas Supreme Court